Amélie Mauresmo and Chanda Rubin were the defending champions, but Mauresmo chose not to participate this year. Rubin participated with Els Callens, but the pair lost in the final to Jelena Dokic and Nadia Petrova, 6–1, 6–4.

Seeds

Draw

Draw

Qualifying

Seeds

Qualifiers

  Petra Mandula /  Patricia Wartusch

Draw

References
 Main Draw (ITF)
 Qualifying Draw (ITF)

Generali Ladies Linz - Doubles